Suicide Pact is the debut album by Los Angeles-based band JJAMZ, released by Dangerbird Records on July 10, 2012. It was released on CD and vinyl on July 17, 2012. A free download of the single, "Heartbeat" can be obtained on their website.

Track listing

Chart performance
The album's lead single, "Heartbeat", was a big hit in the Philippines, where the song peaked at #1 for 3 consecutive weeks at the country's premier RT 30 Countdown, only to be dislodged from the top spot by local act Rico Blanco.

Personnel

JJAMZ
 Z Berg – vocals
 Jason Boesel – drums, percussion, keyboards 
 Alex Greenwald – guitar, bass, keyboards, vocals
 Michael Runion – bass, guitar, vocals
 James Valentine – guitar, synth

Additional musicians
 Taylor Goldsmith – kazoo 
 Blake Mills – guitar
 Sam Sugarman – guitar (during the tour)

Technical personnel
 Reuben Cohen – mastering
 Pierre de Reeder – engineering
 Shawn Everett – additional production, engineering, mixing
 Alex Greenwald – engineering, programming
 Kevin Harp – engineering
 JJAMZ – production
 Jason Lader – additional production, engineering
 Kenny Woods – engineering

References

2012 debut albums
Phases (band) albums
Dangerbird Records albums